The Community Center of St Bernard (CCSTB) is a 501(c)(3) nonprofit organization located in Arabi, Louisiana, in St Bernard Parish near New Orleans. The Community Center was founded in 2006 to serve local residents after the overwhelming devastation caused by Hurricane Katrina and Hurricane Rita. The Center was closed briefly during Hurricane Gustav, but was able to reopen almost immediately after the storm. The purpose of the Community Center is to assist local residents in their return to their homes, and to help normalize life.

History

The Community Center was founded in 2006 to serve local residents of St. Bernard Parish after the devastation caused by Hurricane Katrina and Hurricane Rita. In St Bernard Parish, the epicenter of devastation, fully 93% of homes were rated as "severely damaged" or "destroyed". This is the only Parish (county) in the history of our country to have been completely inundated by flood waters. In many cases homes and businesses were covered up to the rooftops. One hundred and eighty people in the Parish drowned. It is also the home to the largest residential domestic oil spill in US history, when the Murphy Oil Spill (Chalmette, Louisiana) released more than 1,000,000 gallons of crude oil.

Activities

The Center is dedicated to providing a wide range of necessary community services, including free food, clothes, hot meals, internet access, free long distance and local phones, computer classes, and community events such as after school programs and workshops. The Community Center also partners with local agencies and gives them space to provide their services at the Center. This program is called the Community Connections Model and effectively turns the Community Center into a one stop shop for recovery resources in Greater New Orleans Area. Some partner agencies include Staff from the Louisiana Department of Social Services, Office of Family Support, Road Home, Senior Community Service Employment Program, Families Helping Families, Red Cross, St Anna’s Medical Mission, Mom & Baby Mobile Health Center, Daughters of Charity, and Swan River Yoga. The Center also hosts a variety of workshops, dances and holiday celebrations that are free to the public.

Community Center Results: 2009

The onsite Mustard Seed Food Pantry gave 257,959 lbs of food to 6,656 unique low-income individuals.

The onsite Food for Seniors program distributed an additional 26,200 lbs to low-income seniors.

The Mustard Seed Clothing Bank was accessed 24,712.

Office Staff distributed 28,693 flyers, brochures, and pamphlets to help clients find the help they need.

1,751 people received help with applying for the federal Food Stamps program.

Our media lab (internet computers, public phones, fax & copying) was used 9,021 times.

157 people signed up for our free computer classes.

3,971 free books were given out in our reading area.

1,157 volunteers put in an incredible 7,185 hours to make all this possible.

External links
Times Picayune 
Keene Sentinel 
WWL-TV 
The Weather Channel (United States) 
WWOZ 
Beth’s Blog 
NTEN 
Community Center of St Bernard 

St. Bernard Parish, Louisiana
Non-profit organizations based in Louisiana